Israel Sipho Makoe Matseke-Zulu (formerly known as Israel Makoe), is a South African actor, poet and dancer primarily known for his roles in motion pictures like iNumber Number (2013) and its series sequel, Four Corners (2013), Tsotsi (2005), Hard to Get (2014) and Gomora (which he exited because his legs were immobile) just to mention few.

Makoe is an ex-convict, he was incarcerated three years for car hijacking and housebreaking at Johannesburg Prison from 1996 to 1999. After his prison  departure he has then playing thug/villain roles in most of his characters if not all.

References

External links 

South African television personalities
South African male television actors
Living people
Year of birth missing (living people)